Pedro Almeida may refer to:
Pedro Almeida (equestrian), Brazilian Olympic equestrian
Pedro Almeida (footballer, born 1994), Portuguese footballer who plays as a defender
Pedro Almeida (footballer, born 1993), Portuguese footballer who plays as a defender